"Walkin' Away" is a song written by Annie Roboff and Craig Wiseman, and recorded by American country music group Diamond Rio.  It was released in November 1995 as the lead-off single from the album IV.

Content 
In the song, the narrator pleads with his estranged lover by saying that just because he may lose his cool every now and then, their love is still good and that they will not get anywhere by walking away from each other.

Music video 
The music video, directed by Deaton-Flanigen, consists of alternating scenes of the band playing in a small warehouse and short scenes of the band-members and their "dates".

Chart performance 
The song entered the charts in early 1996 and peaked at number 2 on both The Billboard Hot Country Songs chart and Canada's RPM country chart.

Year-end charts

References 

1996 singles
Diamond Rio songs
Songs written by Craig Wiseman
Music videos directed by Deaton-Flanigen Productions
Arista Nashville singles
Songs written by Annie Roboff
1995 songs